BBC Archives is a live album by the British heavy metal band Iron Maiden, released on 4 November 2002 as part of the Eddie's Archive box set. It is a collection of songs from three live shows and one live radio broadcast, recorded by the BBC between 1979 and 1988.

Track listing
All songs written by Steve Harris, except where noted.

Disc One

Disc Two

Personnel
Production and performance credits are adapted from the album liner notes.

Iron Maiden

BBC Radio 1 Friday Rock Show, 14 November 1979
 Paul Di'Anno – vocals
 Steve Harris – bass
 Dave Murray – guitar
 Tony Parsons – guitar
 Doug Sampson: drums

Reading Festival, 28 August 1982
 Bruce Dickinson – vocals
 Steve Harris – bass
 Dave Murray – guitar
 Adrian Smith – guitar
 Clive Burr – drums

Reading Festival, 23 August 1980
 Paul Di'Anno – vocals
 Steve Harris – bass
 Dave Murray – guitar
 Dennis Stratton – guitar
 Clive Burr – drums

Monsters of Rock festival, Donington, 20 August 1988
 Bruce Dickinson – vocals
 Steve Harris – bass
 Dave Murray – guitar
 Adrian Smith – guitar
 Nicko McBrain – drums

Production
Tony Wilson – producer, mixing
Nick Watson – mastering
Derek Riggs – cover illustration
Ross Halfin – photography
Robert Ellis – photography
George Bodnar – photography
George Chin – photography
Tony Motram – photography
Virginia Turbett – photography
Rod Smallwood – management
Andy Taylor – management
Merck Mercuriadis – management

References

BBC Archives (Iron Maiden album), The
Albums produced by Tony Wilson
Iron Maiden compilation albums
BBC Archives, The
BBC Archives, The
2002 compilation albums
EMI Records compilation albums
EMI Records live albums
Live heavy metal albums